Events from the year 1714 in Denmark.

Incumbents
 Monarch – Frederick IV
 Grand Chancellor – Christian Christophersen Sehested

Events
 18 April – The County of Knuthenborg is established by Adam Christopher Knuth from the manors of Knuthenborg, Maribo Ladegaard, Bandholmgård, Havlykke, Vårskov and Knuthenlund
 10 December – the College of Missions is established.

Births

 23 August – Hans Jacob Scheel, Dano-Norwegian Major-General (died 1774 in Norway)

Undated 

 Johan Foltmar – composer (died 1794)

Deaths

 27 March – Charlotte Amalie of Hesse-Kassel, Queen of Denmark and Norway (born 1650 in the Holy Roman Empire)
 6 August – Oliger Paulli, merchant and publisher (born 1644)

References

 
1710s in Denmark
Denmark
Years of the 18th century in Denmark